Charles DeKay Cooper (1769 – January 30, 1831) was an American physician, lawyer and Democratic-Republican politician.

Early life
Born in Rhinebeck, New York, he was the son of Dr. Ananias Cooper and Elizabeth DeKay Cooper. 

He studied medicine with Dr. Crosby in New York City and became a physician, like his father. By 1791, Cooper had settled in Albany. In 1792, he began to practice medicine.

Career
In 1794, he was appointed Health Officer of the Port of Albany

In February 1804, Cooper attended a dinner party during which Alexander Hamilton spoke forcefully and eloquently against the Federalists' plan to nominate Aaron Burr as their candidate for Governor of New York. Cooper later wrote a letter to Philip Schuyler, Alexander Hamilton's father-in-law, in which he made reference to the "despicable opinion" Hamilton had expressed about Burr. The letter was published in The Albany Register, but was tame compared to other attacks on Burr in the press. Still, Cooper's letter proved the last straw in the ongoing rivalry between Burr and Hamilton. When Burr read the letter weeks later, shortly after his defeat in the governor's race, he was enraged by Hamilton's alleged remarks, and challenged Hamilton to a duel, in which Hamilton was killed.

From March 1806 to June 1807, Cooper was First Judge of the Albany County Court. From 1815 to 1816, he was a member of the Erie Canal Commission. In April 1817, while his father-in-law was Acting Governor, Cooper was appointed Secretary of State of New York.

Personal life
He married Margaret Vernor (–1860), the adopted daughter of the future Lt. Gov. John Tayler and the former Margarita Van Valkenburgh. They had five children, including:

 John Tayler Cooper (1798–1878), a lawyer and Major-General who married a daughter of John Vernon Henry.
 Charles DeKay Cooper (1813–1902), a Reverend who married Cornelia Lansing Sutherland, a granddaughter of Chancellor John Lansing, Jr.

Death and burial
Cooper died on January 30, 1831. He was buried in the Dutch Reformed section of the State Street Burying Grounds, but his remains were later removed to a family plot in the Albany Rural Cemetery.

Sources

Charles D. Cooper on Political Graveyard
About his letter to P. Schuyler, at PBS
Obit of his son, spelling erroneously the name of Gov. John Tayler and confusing the names of the governor and Charles Cooper's brother John Tayler Cooper, in The New York Times on October 13, 1902 (PDF)
Bio at NYSM
Short bio, at Rootsweb
Bio of Margaret Vernor, at NYSM
Report submitted by the Canal Commission on March 8, 1816, to the State Assembly, signed by Cooper, in Niles Weekly Register (Vol. 10, March 1816, page 101)
Cooper genealogy in A History of the County of Westchester, from Its First Settlement to the Present Time by Robert Bolton (Alexander S. Gould, 1848, Vol. 2, page 511)
The New York Civil List compiled by Franklin Benjamin Hough (page 358; Weed, Parsons and Co., 1858)
List of canal commissioners
Death date from The Annals of Albany Vol. VI, by Joel Munsell (re-published by BiblioBazaar, LLC, 2008, page 142) {The burial ground inscription says "...in the 60th year of his age." but all sources give 1769 as birth year, which means he died in his 62nd year.]

1769 births
1831 deaths
19th-century American lawyers
19th-century American physicians
19th-century American politicians
Burials at Albany Rural Cemetery
Democratic-Republican Party politicians
Erie Canal Commissioners
Lawyers from Albany, New York
New York (state) state court judges
People from Rhinebeck, New York
Physicians from Albany, New York
Politicians from Albany, New York
Secretaries of State of New York (state)